The Hermannsburg Potters are a group of Aranda women who formed an arts centre in Hermannsburg, Northern Territory (Ntaria) who work with painted ceramics that draw on many influences, while strongly reflect the distinctive visual Aboriginal culture of Central Australia.

History and influences 
Hermannsburg has a strong history with many artistic successes and it is one of the birthplaces of contemporary Aboriginal art. 

One of the first western artists to visit the Hermannsburg Community was Violet Teauge, who came to raise money for the Kuprilya Springs Pipeline, and she was followed soon after by Rex Battarbee who encouraged and supported Albert Namatjira, in internationally successful artist from the community, who was the beginning of the watercolour art movement in Hermannsburg. Both the Hermannsburg Potters and the Iltja Ntjarra (Many Hands) Art Centre are influenced by this movement.

Pastor Albrecht, a Lutheran missionary, who worked at Hermannsburg from 1926 - 1952, actively encouraged the development of the arts industry as a means for the community to make money; especially in the 1930s when a number of tourists started visiting the community. 

The Hermannsburg Potters, which is women's only, are a more recent artistic incarnation in the community and it was started when, in 1990, senior law man Nashasson Ungwanaka invited an accomplished ceramicist Naomi Sharp to come and teach. The first small exhibition was held in Alice Springs in August 1991.

Technique 

Aboriginal people are intrinsically linked to and inseparable from their land, and clay is an important part of this as it is a "part of the skin of the earth itself". 

Using this, almost sacred, clay the Hermannsburg Potters were able to create a distinctive style using the traditional hand-coil technique, and the lids support distinctive colourful sculpted animal, birds, bush tucker and aspects of community life.

Artists 
Elaine Namatjira, granddaughter of Albert Namatjira, was one of the leading artists. Her work influenced her nephew, Vincent Namatjira.

, senior artists at Hermannsburg Potters include:

 Anita Ratara Mbitjana
 Dawn Wheeler Ngala
 Hayley Coulthard Pangangka
 Irene Entata Mbitjana
 Judith Inkamala Pungkarta
 Lindy Rontji Pangangka
 Rahel Ungwanaka Kngwarria
 Rone Rubuntja Panangka
 Sonia Davis

References

External links

Australian potters
Northern Territory